American singer-songwriter Billie Eilish has co-written almost every song in her discography with her brother, Finneas O'Connell, who produces most of them. In 2015, she uploaded three songs to SoundCloud: "Fingers Crossed", "She's Broken", and "Ocean Eyes". Eilish wrote "Fingers Crossed" by herself, whereas "She's Broken" and "Ocean Eyes" were written by Finneas. Out of these three, "Ocean Eyes" became an instant hit; it led her to being signed to Darkroom and Interscope Records the following year. In August 2017, Eilish released her debut EP Don't Smile at Me. It was written by Eilish alongside Finneas, and primarily includes electropop songs with influences of R&B and jazz. "&Burn" and "Lovely" were collaborations with Vince Staples and Khalid, respectively. Eilish's songs have also appeared on soundtracks—"Ocean Eyes" on Everything, Everything (Original Motion Picture Soundtrack) (2017), "Bored" on 13 Reasons Why (A Netflix Original Series Soundtrack) (2017), and "Lovely" on 13 Reasons Why: Season 2 (Music from the Original TV Series) (2018).

Her debut studio album, When We All Fall Asleep, Where Do We Go?, was issued in March 2019, and featured the globally successful and her first Billboard Hot 100 number-one single "Bad Guy", for which a remix with Justin Bieber was eventually released. Further singles to aid the record included "You Should See Me in a Crown", "When the Party's Over", "Bury a Friend" and "Wish You Were Gay". Musically, When We All Fall Asleep, Where Do We Go? was described by critics as a pop, electropop, avant-pop, and art pop effort. Its songs explore themes such as modern youth, drug-addiction, heartbreak, suicide, and mental health, with lyrical sensibilities of humor and horror; Eilish said the album was inspired by lucid dreaming and night terrors. From late 2019 to early 2021, Eilish released several commercially successful singles—"Everything I Wanted", "No Time to Die", "My Future", "Therefore I Am" and "Lo Vas a Olvidar"—with the latter being a collaboration with Rosalía for the television series Euphoria. Eilish released her second studio album, Happier Than Ever, on July 30, 2021.

Songs

See also
 Billie Eilish discography

Notes

References

Eilish, Billie